The Winona Commercial Historic District comprises six downtown blocks along 3rd Street in Winona, Minnesota, United States.  It comprises 65 contributing properties mostly built in the 1880s and 1890s.  The district was listed on the National Register of Historic Places in 1998 for having local significance in the theme of commerce.  It was nominated for reflecting the prosperity of a river and rail town that grew into southeast Minnesota's leading commercial center of the late 19th century.

See also
 National Register of Historic Places listings in Winona County, Minnesota

References

External links

Buildings and structures in Winona, Minnesota
Commercial buildings on the National Register of Historic Places in Minnesota
Historic districts on the National Register of Historic Places in Minnesota
National Register of Historic Places in Winona County, Minnesota